Biedl is a surname. Notable people with the surname include:

 (born 1938), German computer scientist
Arthur Biedl (1869–1933), Hungarian pathologist
 (1904–1950), Austrian philologist
Therese Biedl, Austrian computer scientist